Muhammad Amin Khan was Khan of Turpan from 1682 to 1694. He was the younger brother of Abd ar-Rashid Khan II and the grandson of Ismail Khan (Moghul khan).

Revival of the Khanship
Muhammad Amin Khan tried to re-established his authority as khan and sought external support. He twice sent tribute to the Qing government in the name of khan of Turpan, and sent an embassy to the Mughal Court in India in 1690. The next year he dispatched an embassy to Subhan Quli, the Uzbek Khan of Bukhara (1680–1720), seeking help against "Qirkhiz infidels" (meaning the Dzungars), who "had acquired dominance over the country".

War against the Dzungars
In 1693-94 Muhammad Amin Khan led an expedition against Yining, the Dzungar capital, capturing over 30,000 Kalmyks and Oirats.

Death
The Khan was overthrown and killed during a revolt by Afaq Khoja's followers in 1694. Afaq khoja's son Yahya Khoja took the throne but the rule of the  lasted for only two years. Afaq Khoja and his son were both killed in succession during local rebellions.

References 
Age of Achievement: AD 750 to the End of the Fifteenth Century,  Volume 5, By C. Adle, Irfan Habib, page 192

1694 deaths
Chagatai khans
Year of birth unknown